Dar Al Jaziri is a palace in the medina of Tunis. Located in the Tribunal Street, a few meters from Dar Lasram, it was one of the residences of the Jaziri family between the 12th and 18th centuries.

In 1937, it housed the second Neo Destour congress. Listed as an historical building in 1992, it is nowadays the seat of the House of Poetry.

Near the palace stands the family mausoleum known as Tourbet Al Jaziri, its door opening in front of Dar Lasram.

References

External links 
 

Jaziri